Craigierig is a village on the Megget Reservoir, in the Scottish Borders area of Scotland, in the former Selkirkshire.

Places nearby include the Glengaber Burn, Henderland, St Mary's Loch, the Tibbie Shiels Inn, and Yarrow Water.

See also
List of places in the Scottish Borders
List of places in Scotland

References
 Lonie, W (1995), 'Droveway sign-wall'
 The Geological Society, Scottish Journal of Geology, A new, stratigraphically significant Torquigraptus species (Silurian graptolite) from the Southern Uplands Terrane, Mark Williams et al.
 Proc Soc Antiq Scot, 1981, 401-429: Cramalt tower: historical survey and excavations 1977-9 by Alastair M T Maxwell-Irving

External links
RCAHMS record of Craigie Rig, Craigierig
CANMORE/RCAHMS record of Craigie Rig
RCAHMS record of Glengaber Burn
Geograph image: Craigierig Farm, viewed from Syart Law and up by Yair Sike towards Black Pig

Villages in the Scottish Borders